Petr Obdržálek (born 26 September 1986) is a Czech-Slovak professional ice hockey left winger who currently playing for HK Dukla Trenčín of the Slovak Extraliga.

Obdržálek previously played in the Czech Extraliga for HC Plzeň and Rytíři Kladno. He has also played for HK 36 Skalica, HKM Zvolen and HC Nové Zámky.

Career statistics

Regular season and playoffs

References

External links
 

1986 births
Living people
Czech ice hockey left wingers
Ice hockey people from Brno
SHK Hodonín players
HC Kometa Brno players
Hokej Šumperk 2003 players
SK Horácká Slavia Třebíč players
HC Plzeň players
HK 36 Skalica players
Rytíři Kladno players
IHC Písek players
HKM Zvolen players
HC RT Torax Poruba players
HC Nové Zámky players
MHk 32 Liptovský Mikuláš players
HK Dukla Trenčín players
Czech expatriate ice hockey players in Slovakia